The Mohe, Malgal, or Mogher, or Mojie, were an East Asian Tungusic people who lived primarily in the modern geographical region of Northeast Asia. The two most powerful Mohe groups were known as the Heishui Mohe, located along the Amur River, and the Sumo Mohe, named after the Songhua River.

The Mohe constituted a major part of the population in the kingdom of Balhae in northeast Asia, which lasted from the late 7th century to early 10th century. After the fall of Balhae, few historical traces of the Mohe can be found, though they are considered to be the primary ethnic group from whom the Jurchen people descended. The Heishui Mohe in particular are considered to be the direct ancestors of the Jurchens, from whom the 17th century Manchu people and Qing dynasty founders originated. The Mohe practiced a sedentary agrarian lifestyle and were predominantly farmers who grew soybean, wheat, millet, and rice, supplemented by pig raising and hunting for meat. The Mohe were also known to have worn pig and dog skin coats.

Name

The Chinese exonym Mohe (靺鞨) is a graphic pejorative written with mo 靺 "socks; stockings" and he 鞨 "shoes". Mo (靺) (Middle Chinese: /muɑt̚/) is an adjective, a customary expression meaning "barbarian" or Xiongnu. Before the Five dynasties period, it was recorded as "靺羯", such as on the Honglujing Stele. 

He 鞨 is gal (Middle Chinese gat or  /ɦɑt̚/), meaning "stone" by Mohe/Malgal, Jie/Gal language. The Jie ruler Shi Le (石勒) takes the surname shi (石 "stone") from gal. According to the History of Jin (Jin Shi), Shi Tumen (石土門) is the prince of the Jurchen people, whose surname shi hints to a connection with the Mohe and Jie.

The ethnonym of the Mohe bears a notable resemblance to that of the later historically attested *Motgit in Middle Chinese (Korean: 물길 [Mulgil]; Japanese: もつきつ [Motsukitsu]).

The name of the Mohe also appears as "Maka" in "Shin-Maka" (Japanese 新靺鞨, しんまか) or "New Mohe," which is the name of a dance and the musical piece that accompanies it; the dance and song were introduced to the Japanese court during the Nara period or around the beginning of the Heian period from the Balhae kingdom. In modern Japanese historical texts, the name of the Mohe is annotated with the "kana" reading Makkatsu (まっかつ), which is probably a transliteration based on the standard Sino-Japanese readings of the Chinese characters used to transcribe the ethnonym of the Mohe.

Tribes

According to some records, there were seven/eight Mohe tribes :

Notable personalities

Prefecture Mohe chieftains 
 Sumo Mohe
 Tudiji (突地稽 pinyin: Tūdìjī, Manchu: Tulergi (alien people), Hangul: 돌지계), ca. 580-620
 Li Jinhang (李謹行 pinyin: Lǐ Jǐnháng, Hangul: 이근행), 619-683, Tudiji's son
 Dae Joyeong (大祚榮 pinyin: Dá Zuòróng, Hangul: 대조영), ?-719
 Baishan Mohe
 Geolsa Biu (乞四比羽 pinyin: Qǐsì Bǐyǔ, Hangul: 걸사비우)
 Heisui Mohe
 A Tou (阿頭 pinyin: Ā Tóu, Manchu: Uju (head, chief), Hangul:아두)
 Tou Fu (陁弗 pinyin: Toú fú, Hangul: 타불)
 Su Wugai (蘇勿蓋 pinyin: Sū Wùgài, Manchu: Sotki (crusian), Hangul: 소홀개)
 Gao Zhimen (高之門 pinyin: Gāo Zīemén, Manchu: Hocihon mangga (handsome and strong), Hangul: 고지문)
 Wusukemeng (烏素可蒙 pinyin: Wū sù kě méng, Manchu: Osohon mangga (small but strong), Hangul: 오소고몽)
 Nisuliji (倪屬利稽 pinyin:Ní shǔ lì jī, Manchu: Nisurigi (finger ring for archery), Hangul: 아속리계)
 Funie Mohe
 Shiyimeng (失異夢 pinyin: Shī yì mèng, Manchu: Silin mangga (elite and strong), Hangul: 실이몽)
 Li Duozuo (李多祚 pinyin: Lǐ Duōzuò, Hangul: 이다조)
 Yuexi Mohe
 Wushikemeng (烏施可蒙 pinyin: Wū shī kě méng, Manchu: Osohon mangga (small but strong), Hangul: 오시가몽)

See also
Balhae
Jie people (Gal people)
Shi Le
Guanqiu Jian

References

Citations

Bibliography

See also
History of China
History of Manchuria
Balhae

 
Ancient peoples of China
History of Manchuria
History of Korea
Tungusic peoples